Vandervort Hill is a mountain located in the Catskill Mountains of New York southwest of Franklin. Wheat Hill is located east, Hodges Hill is located southeast and Crane Hill is located west-southwest of Vandervort Hill.

References

Mountains of Delaware County, New York
Mountains of New York (state)